Calosoma pavlovskii is a species of ground beetle in the subfamily of Carabinae. It was described by Kryzhanovskij in 1955.

References

pavlovskii
Beetles described in 1955